The Paramount Theatre is located in downtown Abilene, Texas at 352 Cypress Street.

The Paramount was built in 1930 by H. O. Wooten, adjacent to his Hotel Wooten.  Opening night was May 19, 1930, with the film, Safety in Numbers starring Carole Lombard.  On February 12, 1931, Universal Pictures selected the Abilene Paramount, along with a few others in the Interstate Theatre chain, to exhibit the 1931 horror classic Dracula, a full two days before its Valentine's Day premiere. The Paramount continued to operate as a movie theater until the 1970s, when the decline of downtown Abilene resulted in declining box office revenue. The theater was closed in 1979 for the first time since opening in 1930. The Abilene Preservation League formed the Paramount Committee to prevent the building from eminent demolition by working with the National Register of Historic Places. The Paramount was later restored with funding from Julia Matthews and the Dodge Jones Foundation in 1986. The Paramount currently features: films, live theatre performances, 1,187 split-aisle seats, Spanish-Moorish interior, and a domed ceiling with moving clouds and glittering stars.

At the Paramount, visitors can catch performances featuring: Abilene Ballet Theatre, the Abilene Opera association, the Celebration Singers, the Abilene Children's Performing Arts Series, Abilene Community Band, the Classical Chorus of Abilene, and a large variety of professional and amateur shows.

The theatre also produces live theatre. In 1993, the Paramount began putting together the annual Paramount Summer Musical. Every summer, for decades the theatre has put on productions casting local amateur actors, and employing some of the best musicians, choreographers, set designers, and costumers from the area.  The theatre has also worked closely with all three local university theatre departments. In 2003, the Paramount began an annual children's show each January.  And in 2016 the theatre began staging a play each September.

The Paramount is best known, though, as a movie house.  The annual Paramount Film Series has shown hundreds of films since the relaunch of the theatre in 1987. In 2019, over 14,000 people came to see a movie at the Paramount.

See also

National Register of Historic Places listings in Taylor County, Texas

References

External links

Buildings and structures in Abilene, Texas
Theatres on the National Register of Historic Places in Texas
Tourist attractions in Taylor County, Texas
National Register of Historic Places in Taylor County, Texas